Nuit Blanche is the third album by Belgian electronic group Vive la Fête.

Track listing

 On the Brazilian digipak edition, track 2 is "Schwarzkopf". The track "Touche Pas" is only available in Brazil in the best-of collection "10 Ans de Fête".
 There is a hidden track at the end of the "Adieu".

2003 albums
Vive La Fête albums